Mohammed Abdulla Hassan Mohamed (born 2 December 1978) is an Emirati football referee who has been a full international referee for FIFA since 2010.

He was one of the referees of the 2015 AFC Asian Cup.

In June 2022, he officiated the CONCACAF–OFC Intercontinental playoff match between Costa Rica and New Zealand for the 2022 FIFA World Cup

References

1978 births
Living people
Emirati football referees
2018 FIFA World Cup referees
2022 FIFA World Cup referees
FIFA World Cup referees
AFC Asian Cup referees